The Hwangseong Sinmun ("Capital Gazette" or "Imperial Capital Gazette") (1898-1910) was one of Korea's earliest Korean-language dailies. It was established by Namgung Ok (1863-1939) and Na Sugyeong (1861-1926) in 1898 to serve as a mouthpiece for those elements of the Korean progressive movement less keen on the strong Christian orientation of the country's other major reform-minded newspaper, The Independent.  Published in Korean mixed script, one of the paper's most notable contributors was Shin Chaeho, the Korean nationalist historian. Reflecting its reformist bent, the Hwangseong sinmun published in a mixture of Hanja and native Korean script. In the wake of Japan's assumption of protectorship over the Korean Empire in 1905, the newspaper responded with strongly worded criticisms. Most prominent among these was an editorial by Jang Jiyeon (1864-1921) entitled, "I Wail Bitterly Today ( or ). The newspaper was forced to close soon after the Japanese annexation of Korea in 1910.

Throughout its thirteen years of publishing the subscription rates for the paper hovered around 3,000 copies.

References

Korean-language newspapers
1898 establishments in Korea
1910 disestablishments
Newspapers published in Korea
Publications established in 1898